Hayman is both a surname and a given name. Notable people with the name include:

Surname
Al Hayman (1847–1917), business partner of Charles Frohman in Theatrical Syndicate
Andy Hayman, CBE, QPM (born 1959), retired British police officer, author of The Terrorist Hunters
Brett Hayman (born 1972), Australian rowing cox
Carl Hayman (born 1979), international rugby union footballer
Carole Hayman, English writer, broadcaster and journalist
Connie Passalacqua Hayman, American journalist and educator
Conway Hayman (born 1949), former American football player and coach
Cyd Hayman (born 1944), English actress
Damaris Hayman (1929–2021), actress best known for character roles on television
Darren Hayman (born 1970), English singer-songwriter and guitarist
David Hayman (born 1961) Scottish actor and director
Francis Hayman (1708–1776), English painter and illustrator, one of the founding members of the Royal Academy in 1768
Harold Hayman (1894–1966), British Labour Party politician
Helene Hayman, Baroness Hayman, GBE, PC (born 1949), Lord Speaker of the House of Lords in the Parliament of the UK
Henry Hayman (cricketer) (1853–1941), English cricketer
Henry Hayman Toulmin (1807–1871), wealthy British ship owner, became Justice of the Peace and High Sheriff of Hertfordshire
Horace Hayman Wilson (1786–1860), English orientalist
James Hayman, American television producer, director and cinematographer
Lew Hayman (1908–1984), American sports figure
Lillian Hayman (1922–1994), Tony Award-winning African American actress and singer
Margaret Hayman (1923–1994), British mathematics educator, wife of Walter
Mathew Hayman (born 1978), Australian professional road bicycle racer
Michael Hayman (born 1970), British public relations consultant
Patrick Hayman (1915–1988), English artist
Peter Hayman (diplomat), (1914–1992), British diplomat
Peter Hayman (ornithologist) (born 1930), British ornithologist and illustrator
Richard Hayman (1920–2014), American arranger, harmonica player, and conductor
Robert Hayman (1575–1629), poet, colonist and Proprietary Governor of Bristol's Hope colony in Newfoundland
Robert Hayman-Joyce KCB CBE DL (born 1940), former Master-General of the Ordnance
Rollo Hayman (1925–2008), Rhodesian politician
Ron Hayman (born 1958), one of the first Canadian cyclists to turn professional in the late 1970s
Ronald Hayman (1932–2019), British critic, dramatist, and writer best known for his biographies
Ruth Hayman (died 1981), lawyer and anti-apartheid campaigner
Sue Hayman, British Labour Party politician, MP for Workington since 2015
Thomas Hayman (1904–1962), New Zealand politician of the National Party
Walter Hayman FRS (1926–2020), British mathematician known for contributions to complex analysis, husband of Margaret
William Hayman Cummings (1831–1915), English musician, tenor and organist at Waltham Abbey

Given name
Hayman Hayman-Joyce CBE DSO (1897–1958), British Army officer who commanded 4th Division during World War II
Hayman Johnson (1912–1993), eminent Anglican priest in the twentieth century
John Hayman Packer (1730–1806), actor for David Garrick's company at Drury Lane
Hayman Rooke (1723–1806), became an antiquary on his retirement from the Army

See also
Hayman Center, the indoor athletic arena on La Salle University's campus
Hayman drum, introduced in the late 1960s, being made by an English manufacturer
Hayman Fire, forest fire that started 95 miles (153 km) southwest of Denver, Colorado
Hayman Island, the most northerly of the Whitsunday Islands, off the coast of Central Queensland, Australia
Hayman Nunataks, small group of isolated nunataks at the east end of the Grosvenor Mountains, Antarctica
Darren Hayman & the Secondary Modern, British band
Hayman's Dwarf Epauletted Fruit Bat (Micropteropus intermedius), a species of megabat in the family Pteropodidae
Jeptha Hayman House, historic home located at Kingston, Somerset County, Maryland, United States
Lew Hayman Trophy, Canadian Football League trophy

English-language surnames
Surnames of English origin